Marcilly may refer to:

Places in France
Marcilly, Manche, in the Manche département
Marcilly, Seine-et-Marne, in the Seine-et-Marne département
Marcilly-d'Azergues, in the Rhône département
Marcilly-en-Bassigny, in the Haute-Marne département 
Marcilly-en-Beauce, in the Loir-et-Cher département
Marcilly-en-Gault, in the Loir-et-Cher département 
Marcilly-en-Villette, in the Loiret département 
Marcilly-et-Dracy, in the Côte-d'Or département 
Marcilly-la-Campagne, in the Eure département
Marcilly-la-Gueurce, in the Saône-et-Loire département 
Marcilly-le-Châtel, in the Loire département
Marcilly-le-Hayer, in the Aube département 
Marcilly-lès-Buxy, in the Saône-et-Loire département 
Marcilly-Ogny, in the Côte-d'Or département 
Marcilly-sur-Eure, in the Eure département 
Marcilly-sur-Maulne, in the Indre-et-Loire département 
Marcilly-sur-Seine, in the Marne département
Marcilly-sur-Tille, in the Côte-d'Or département 
Marcilly-sur-Vienne, in the Indre-et-Loire département

People with the surname
Frédéric Marcilly (born 1977), French footballer